Nyitrai is the surname of:
Ádám Nyitrai, Hungarian footballer for FC Veszprém
Barbara Nyitrai, municipal clerk of South Brunswick, New Jersey
Imre Nyitrai, player on the 1967 Hungary national basketball team
Márton Nyitrai, director whose video for Warpigs (band) won MTV Europe's Best Hungarian Music Video award in 1999
Vera Nyitrai (1926–2011), Hungarian statistician
Zsolt Nyitrai (born 1977), Hungarian politician
Zsuzsa Nyitrai, Hungarian discus thrower, bronze medalist at the 1966 European Junior Games

See also
FC Nitra, Slovak football club originally called Nyitrai ÖTTSO
Nyitra County, a region of the Kingdom of Hungary now in Slovakia